The Church of the Holy Apostles Peter and Paul, commonly known as Church of St Peter (Црква Светог Петра / Crkva Svetog Petra) or simply Peter's Church (Петрова црква / Petrova crkva) is a Serbian Orthodox church, the oldest intact church in Serbia and one of the oldest ones in the region, situated on a hill of Ras, the medieval capital of the Serbian Grand Principality (Rascia), in Novi Pazar, Serbia. It is part of the Stari Ras complex, an UNESCO World Heritage Site.

It was founded in the 4th century during Roman rule, while additions were made in the 7th and 9th centuries, after which it served as the ecclesiastical seat of the Serbian church, and as the baptismal church and state council site of the Nemanjić dynasty, until the last years of the 12th century. It is dedicated to Saints Peter and Paul.

History

Early

The exact date of founding is unknown; it is mentioned in the 9th century as the seat of the eparchy of Serbia (see Eparchy of Ras). Excavations on the site have unearthed Greek sculptures and Black-figure pottery dating to 7th and 6th century BC, as well as a 5th-century BC princely grave (with regalia, robes, gold-silver jewelry, masks, beads and Attic pottery), underneath the floor of the church in 1957–58. The findings are presently at the National Museum of Serbia, in Belgrade. Roman, Byzantine and medieval Slavic tombs surround the church.

The present church has been built on several earlier churches of which remains have been well preserved. The foundation of the church, the massive columns, ground-plan and the octagonal tower which conceals an inner cupola are examples of the circular mausoleal architectural type used after Emperor Constantine (306–312).

Archaeological findings point that the church has been rebuilt several times in history, beginning in the 4th century, with notable additions made in the 7th century. The architectural style resembles that of early churches in Pomorje, Armenia, Georgia, and Italy, dated to between the 7th and 9th centuries.

Middle Ages

The first Serbian bishopric (Eparchy of Ras) was founded at the political center at Ras, near modern Novi Pazar on the Ibar river.

Ras itself originates from ancient Arsa, and it is mentioned as a Serbian town in Constantine VII's De Administrando Imperio (r. 913–959).  The initial ecclesiastical affiliation is uncertain, it was subordinate to either Split or Durazzo, both then Byzantine (Patriarchate of Constantinople).

The church served as the seat of the Serbian eparchy, as the rotunda plan is characteristic of first court chapels. The bishopric was established shortly after 871, during the rule of Prince Mutimir (r. 850-891), and was part of the general plan of establishing bishoprics in the Slav lands of the Empire, confirmed by the Council of Constantinople in 879-880. Similarly, the Eparchy of Braničevo was founded in 878 (as continuation of Viminacium and Horreum Margi).

Prince Petar (r. 892-917), was entombed in the church. Christianity was spreading in his time. Prince Časlav (r. 927–960) may have added the frescoes, which are dated to the 10th century. Byzantine Emperor John I Tzimiskes (r. 969-976) recognized the Ras region as being the "focus of the Serbian lands", amid his annexation of the region (organizing it into a Catepanate).

The Eparchy of Ras was organized into the newly established Archbishopric of Ohrid (1018), amid the renewed annexation of the region (organizing it into a Theme), as part of a wider Byzantine-Slavic Orthodox area. In the chrysobulls of Emperor Basil II, dated 1020, the Eparchy of Ras is mentioned as serving the whole of Serbia, confirming the church as ecclesiastical seat.

Sometime before 1163, Stefan Nemanja, then only a Prince, was baptized in the church. In 1166, Stefan Nemanja acquired the throne of Serbia with the title of Grand Prince. He was married in the church (to Ana); their two sons, Rastko (later known as Saint Sava; l. 1175-1235), and Stefan Nemanjić, were baptized in the church. Stefan Nemanja held the council that outlawed the Bogumils at the church.

Rastko left Serbia in 1192 for Mount Athos, where he took monastic vows and was given the name Sava. Stefan Nemanja abdicated in 1195, crowning Stefan Nemanjić (r. 1196-1228) at the Church of Peter, then joined his son Sava on Mount Athos. The father and son soon asked the Holy Community for the establishment of the Serbian religious base at the abandoned Hilandar, which they renovated, marking the beginning of cultural prospering (in arts; literature, and religion).

The ancient cell of Helandaris was donated by Emperor Alexios III Angelos (1195-1203) "to the Serbs as an eternal gift..." and Stefan Nemanja establishes and endows the monastery in 1198 (before 13 February 1199).

Nemanja died at Hilandar in 1199, while Sava continued his work in establishing the Serbian church. Henceforth, the Church of Peter ends its service as the seat of the Serbian church. Sava crowned his brother Stefan as "King of Serbia" in 1217. Upon returning to Mount Athos, Sava is consecrated as the first Archbishop of the Serbian church, given autocephaly by Patriarch Manuel I of Constantinople, in 1219, the same year he published the first constitution in Serbia – St. Sava's Nomocanon (Zakonopravilo in Serbian). After the Nemanjić era, not much is mentioned about the church. The church frescoes date to the 10th, 12th and 13th centuries, while some frescoes were repainted in the mid-13th century.

Early modern

After the Ottoman conquest in 1455, the church was not abandoned and is referenced throughout the 16th and 17th centuries. In 1690, the Church is abandoned and the region is largely depopulated amid Ottoman atrocities in Kosovo, amid the Great Turkish War in which Serb rebels fought on the side of the Holy League. Patriarch Arsenije III Čarnojević leads tens of thousands of Serb families to the Christian north.

Metropolitan Arsenije IV Jovanović Šakabenta restored the church in 1728. During the 18th century, the church had the rank of Metropolitanate, and after 1784, the Eparchy of Raška is organized into the Eparchy of Prizren. In the 1830s, the church is built on and restored. Shortly thereafter, the Ottomans took over the church and use it as an ammunition magazine. Since the First Balkan War (1912), it has been a functioning church.

Contemporary

Conservatory work was done in the late 1950s and early 1960s. The Stari Ras-complex, including the church and Sopoćani, was designated a UNESCO World Heritage Site in 1979, the church itself was included due to its uniqueness as one of the oldest churches in the region. It is designated a Cultural Heritage Site of Serbia (the national heritage list), of the Monument of Culture of Exceptional Importance type.

The church's walls were defaced with graffiti on 6 April 2008. The police have not officially concluded who perpetrated the act or why.

Gallery

See also
List of Serbian Orthodox monasteries
Other oldest churches
Church of St. George, Sofia, the oldest church in Bulgaria
Church of Holy Cross, Nin, the oldest church in Croatia
Panagia Ekatontapiliani, the oldest church in Greece
Densuş Church, the oldest church in Romania
Tkhaba-Yerdy Church, the oldest church in Russia
Etchmiadzin Cathedral, the oldest church in Armenia, and the world (UNESCO)

References

Sources
 Mrkobrad, D. "Ras-Postenje, researches of the space north from the central gate on the northeastern wall", Glasnik Srpskog arheološkog društva, no. 13, 1997.
 Александар Дероко, „Монументална и декоративна архитектура у средњовековној Србији“ Београд 1985.
 Јован Деретић, „Културна историја Срба“, Крагујевац 2001;  
 Више аутора, "Нови Пазар и околина", Београд, 1969.

External links

 UNESCO World Heritage Site
St Peter's Church- Virtual Walk and Photo Collection of the Blago Fund
 Municipality of Raska, Church of Peter entry

 

4th-century churches
Cultural Monuments of Exceptional Importance (Serbia)
Medieval Serbian architecture
Archaeological sites in Serbia
Tourist attractions in Serbia
Serbian Orthodox church buildings in Serbia
Raška District
Novi Pazar
World Heritage Sites in Serbia
Byzantine sacred architecture
Palaeo-Christian architecture
Romanesque architecture in Serbia